Víctor Manuel Gerena (born June 24, 1958) is an American fugitive wanted by the Federal Bureau of Investigation for the September 1983 White Eagle armed robbery, as a Wells Fargo employee and a member of the Boricua Popular Army, of a Wells Fargo armored car facility. The $7 million in cash (roughly about $18 million as of May 2021) was the largest cash robbery in U.S. history at that time.

On May 14, 1984, Gerena became the 386th fugitive to be placed on the FBI's Top Ten Most Wanted Fugitives list. He remains at large, and on April 11, 2010, became the fugitive to have spent the most time on the list, surpassing Donald Eugene Webb, who was removed from the list on March 31, 2007, after 25 years, 10 months, and 27 days. There were no leads for many years and Webb was presumed dead. Gerena was removed from the list on December 15, 2016, after 32 years. Gerena is believed to be living in Cuba.

Bank heist
According to law enforcement authorities, on September 12, 1983, Gerena dropped off his girlfriend at Hartford City Hall, where she was to get a marriage license for the couple. He then went to work and spent the rest of the day with co-workers James McKeon and Timothy Girard. At some point, Gerena removed McKeon's gun, handcuffed and tied up his two co-workers, and injected them with aspirin and water in order to further disable them (Gerena thought it would make them sleepy), which did not work. He put $7,000,000 in the trunk of a car, then left with the money.

Fugitive
According to published reports, Gerena was transported to Mexico, where he boarded a Cubana de Aviación jet at Mexico City International Airport in Mexico City, arriving at José Martí International Airport in Havana. Years later, a cousin of Gerena accompanied journalist Edmund Mahoney to Cuba in an attempt to locate Gerena, but they did not succeed. Mahoney published a story in 2001 titled "Chasing Gerena". The FBI is offering a reward of up to $1,000,000 for information leading to Gerena's capture.

See also
List of fugitives from justice who disappeared

References

External links
 
 

1958 births
American emigrants to Cuba
American people of Puerto Rican descent
Boricua Popular Army members
Criminals from New York City
FBI Ten Most Wanted Fugitives
Fugitives wanted by the United States
Fugitives wanted on robbery charges
Living people
People from West Hartford, Connecticut
Security guards